Corpus Christi is the second studio album by American thrash metal band Angkor Wat, released in 1990 by Metal Blade Records.

Track listing

Personnel 
Adapted from the Corpus Christi liner notes.

Angkor Wat
Adam Grossman – vocals, guitar, bass guitar, sampler
Jimmy Lindsey – sampler
Danny Lohner – guitar, bass guitar, sampler
Tony Maingot – sampler, programming (1)
Dave Nuss – drums

Production and additional personnel
Angkor Wat – production
Kerry Crafton – production
Gary Higinbotham – engineering
Don Seay – piano (7)
Mike Soliz – lead vocals (10)

Release history

References

External links 
 

1990 albums
Angkor Wat (band) albums
Metal Blade Records albums